The United Nations Convention Against Illicit Traffic in Narcotic Drugs and Psychotropic Substances of  1988 is one of three major drug control treaties currently in force. It provides additional legal mechanisms for enforcing the 1961 Single Convention on Narcotic Drugs and the 1971 Convention on Psychotropic Substances. The Convention entered into force on November 11, 1990. As of June 2020, there are 191 Parties to the Convention. These include 186 out of 193 United Nations member states (not Equatorial Guinea, Kiribati, Papua New Guinea, Solomon Islands, Somalia, South Sudan, or Tuvalu) and the Holy See, the European Union, the Cook Islands, Niue, and the State of Palestine.

Background

The 1988 Convention was introduced following the political and sociological developments in the 1970s and 1980s. The growing demand for cannabis, cocaine, and heroin for recreational purposes, mostly in the developed world, triggered an increase of illicit production in geographical areas where cannabis, coca, and opium had been traditionally cultivated. With the rising size of the illicit drug trade, international drug trafficking became a multibillion-dollar business dominated by criminal groups, providing grounds for the creation of the 1988 Convention and the consequential escalation of the war on drugs.

The Preamble notes that previous enforcement efforts have not stopped drug use, warning of "steadily increasing inroads into various social groups made by illicit traffic in narcotic drugs and psychotropic substances." It cautions that the drug trade and related activities "undermine the legitimate economies and threaten the stability, security and sovereignty of States." The sense of urgency is underscored by the image of innocent boys and girls being exploited:
[C]hildren are used in many parts of the world as an illicit drug consumers market and for purposes of illicit production, distribution and trade in narcotic drugs and psychotropic substances, which entails a danger of incalculable gravity.

Drug manufacture and distribution

Much of the treaty is devoted to fighting organized crime by mandating cooperation in tracing and seizing drug-related assets. Article 5 of the Convention requires its parties to confiscate proceeds from drug offenses. It also requires parties to empower its courts or other competent authorities to order that bank, financial, or commercial records be made available or seized. The Convention further states that a party may not decline to act on this provision on the ground of bank secrecy.

Article 6 of the Convention provides a legal basis for extradition in drug-related cases among countries having no other extradition treaties. In addition, the Convention requires the parties to provide mutual legal assistance to one another upon request, for purposes of searches, seizures, service of judicial documents, and so on.

In addition, Article 12 of the Convention establishes two categories of controlled illicit drug precursor substances, Table I and Table II. The Commission on Narcotic Drugs has power to decide whether to control a precursor substance, and which Table to place it in. The assessment of the International Narcotics Control Board is binding on the Commission, however, as to scientific matters. A two-thirds vote is required to add a substance to a Table.

Article 12 protects the interests of pharmaceutical and chemical companies by requiring the Board to take into account the "extent, importance and diversity of the licit use of the substance, and the possibility and ease of using alternate substances both for licit purposes and for the illicit manufacture of narcotic drugs or psychotropic substances."

Control of amphetamine-type stimulant precursors has become a major UN priority.

Drug possession

Article 3 of the Convention may require nations to ban possession of drugs for personal use:
Subject to its constitutional principles and the basic concepts of its legal system, each Party shall adopt such measures as may be necessary to establish as a criminal offence under its domestic law, when committed intentionally, the possession, purchase or cultivation of narcotic drugs or psychotropic substances for personal consumption contrary to the provisions of the 1961 Convention, the 1961 Convention as amended or the 1971 Convention.

Previous drug control treaties had targeted drug manufacturers and traffickers, rather than users. In their 2003 article, "The Mechanics and Dynamics of the UN System for International Drug Control," David Bewley-Taylor and Cindy Fazey explain that "[t]he 1988 Convention was an attempt to reach a political balance between consumer and producer countries. Consequently, it was not only the duty of producing countries (e.g. the developing countries of Asia and South America) to suppress illicit supply, but also the duty of consumer countries (e.g. the industrialized countries of Europe and North America) to suppress the demand for drugs."

However, it is unclear whether this provision actually does mandate prohibition of drug possession for personal use, due to the caveat that such possession need only be prohibited if it is "contrary to the provisions of the 1961 Convention, the 1961 Convention as amended or the 1971 Convention." The American National Commission on Marijuana and Drug Abuse found that the provisions of the 1961 Single Convention on Narcotic Drugs against possession apply only to possession related to illicit trafficking, while the Canadian Le Dain Commission of Inquiry into the Non-Medical Use of Drugs found otherwise.

Constitutional issues
Several of the Convention's provisions are prefaced with the words, "Subject to its constitutional principles and the basic concepts of its legal system, each Party shall ..." According to Fazey, "This has been used by the USA not to implement part of article 3 of the 1988 Convention." Similarly, if a national prohibition on drug possession violated a nation's constitution, those provisions would not be binding on that country.

Proposed repeal
In 2003, a European Parliament committee recommended repealing the 1988 Convention, finding that:
[D]espite massive deployment of police and other resources to implement the UN Conventions, production and consumption of, and trafficking in, prohibited substances have increased exponentially over the past 30 years, representing what can only be described as a failure, which the police and judicial authorities also recognise as such ... [T]he policy of prohibiting drugs, based on the UN Conventions of 1961, 1971 and 1988, is the true cause of the increasing damage that the production of, trafficking in, and sale and use of illegal substances are inflicting on whole sectors of society, on the economy and on public institutions, eroding the health, freedom and life of individuals.

The road to repeal would be difficult. Individual nations could withdraw from the treaty under the provisions of Article 30. However, as former UN drug official Cindy Fazey notes, the Convention has no termination clause, and therefore would remain in effect even if only one signatory remained. The Transnational Radical Party report noted that denunciation is the only route to changing the control regime established by the treaty:
As regards the 1988 Convention, written with the main objective of strengthening all aspects of prohibition (also at the level of consumption, establishing the reversal of the burden of proof for persons suspected of carrying forbidden substances), it was deemed not amendable, therefore, the only possible way to go about it would be its denunciation by a substantial number of contracting Parties.

List of controlled drug precursors 

Source: INCB Red List (14th Edition, January 2015)

The list of 23 substances is identical to list of EU-controlled drug precursors, except for the different categorization and inclusion of stereoisomers in EU Category 1.

Table I 
 acetic anhydride
 N-Acetylanthranilic acid
 ephedrine
 ergometrine
 ergotamine
 isosafrole
 lysergic acid
 3,4-methylenedioxyphenyl-2-propanone
 norephedrine
 phenylacetic acid
 1-phenyl-2-propanone
 alpha-phenylacetoacetonitrile (APAAN)
 piperonal
 potassium permanganate
 pseudoephedrine
 safrole

The salts of the substances listed in this Table whenever the existence of such salts is possible.

Table II 
 acetone
 anthranilic acid
 diethyl ether
 hydrochloric acid (hydrogen chloride)
 methyl ethyl ketone
 piperidine
 sulphuric acid
 toluene

The salts of the substances listed in this Table whenever the existence of such salts is possible.

The salts of hydrochloric acid and sulphuric acid are specifically excluded from Table II.

See also 
 List of UN-controlled narcotic drugs
 List of UN-controlled psychotropic substances
 List of EU-controlled drug precursors
 List of US-controlled drug precursors

See also 
 Single Convention on Narcotic Drugs of 1961
 Convention on Psychotropic Substances of 1971

References

Citations

Sources 

 A Primer on the UN Drug Control Conventions Transnational Institute, 2015.
 Bewley-Taylor, David R. and Fazey, Cindy S. J.: The Mechanics and Dynamics of the UN System for International Drug Control, March 14, 2003.
 

United Nations Convention Against Illicit Traffic in Narcotic Drugs and Psychotropic Substances
United Nations Convention Against Illicit Traffic in Narcotic Drugs and Psychotropic Substances
United Nations Convention Against Illicit Traffic in Narcotic Drugs and Psychotropic Substances
United Nations Convention Against Illicit Traffic in Narcotic Drugs and Psychotropic Substances
United Nations treaties
Treaties of Albania
Treaties of Algeria
Treaties of Andorra
Treaties of Angola
Treaties of Antigua and Barbuda
Treaties of Argentina
Treaties of Armenia
Treaties of Australia
Treaties of Austria
Treaties of Azerbaijan
Treaties of the Bahamas
Treaties of Bahrain
Treaties of Bangladesh
Treaties of Barbados
Treaties of Belarus
Treaties of Belgium
Treaties of Belize
Treaties of Benin
Treaties of Bhutan
Treaties of Bolivia
Treaties of Bosnia and Herzegovina
Treaties of Botswana
Treaties of Brazil
Treaties of Brunei
Treaties of Bulgaria
Treaties of Burkina Faso
Treaties of Burundi
Treaties of Cambodia
Treaties of Cameroon
Treaties of Canada
Treaties of Cape Verde
Treaties of the Central African Republic
Treaties of Chile
Treaties of the People's Republic of China
Treaties of Colombia
Treaties of the Comoros
Treaties of the Republic of the Congo
Treaties of the Cook Islands
Treaties of Costa Rica
Treaties of Ivory Coast
Treaties of Croatia
Treaties of Cuba
Treaties of Cyprus
Treaties of the Czech Republic
Treaties of Czechoslovakia
Treaties of North Korea
Treaties of the Democratic Republic of the Congo
Treaties of Denmark
Treaties of Djibouti
Treaties of Dominica
Treaties of the Dominican Republic
Treaties of Ecuador
Treaties of Egypt
Treaties of El Salvador
Treaties of Eritrea
Treaties of Estonia
Treaties of the Transitional Government of Ethiopia
Treaties of Fiji
Treaties of Finland
Treaties of France
Treaties of Gabon
Treaties of the Gambia
Treaties of Georgia (country)
Treaties of Germany
Treaties of Ghana
Treaties of Greece
Treaties of Grenada
Treaties of Guatemala
Treaties of Guinea
Treaties of Guinea-Bissau
Treaties of Guyana
Treaties of Haiti
Treaties of Honduras
Treaties of the Hungarian People's Republic
Treaties of Iceland
Treaties of India
Treaties of Indonesia
Treaties of Iran
Treaties of Ba'athist Iraq
Treaties of Ireland
Treaties of Israel
Treaties of Italy
Treaties of Jamaica
Treaties of Japan
Treaties of Jordan
Treaties of Kazakhstan
Treaties of Kenya
Treaties of Kuwait
Treaties of Kyrgyzstan
Treaties of Laos
Treaties of Latvia
Treaties of Lebanon
Treaties of Lesotho
Treaties of Liberia
Treaties of the Libyan Arab Jamahiriya
Treaties of Liechtenstein
Treaties of Lithuania
Treaties of Luxembourg
Treaties of Madagascar
Treaties of Malawi
Treaties of Malaysia
Treaties of the Maldives
Treaties of Mali
Treaties of Malta
Treaties of the Marshall Islands
Treaties of Mauritania
Treaties of Mauritius
Treaties of Mexico
Treaties of the Federated States of Micronesia
Treaties of Monaco
Treaties of Mongolia
Treaties of Montenegro
Treaties of Morocco
Treaties of Mozambique
Treaties of Myanmar
Treaties of Namibia
Treaties of Nepal
Treaties of the Netherlands
Treaties of New Zealand
Treaties of Nicaragua
Treaties of Niue
Treaties of Niger
Treaties of Nigeria
Treaties of Norway
Treaties of Oman
Treaties of Pakistan
Treaties of the State of Palestine
Treaties of Panama
Treaties of Paraguay
Treaties of Peru
Treaties of the Philippines
Treaties of Poland
Treaties of Portugal
Treaties of Qatar
Treaties of South Korea
Treaties of Moldova
Treaties of the Socialist Republic of Romania
Treaties of Russia
Treaties of Rwanda
Treaties of Samoa
Treaties of San Marino
Treaties of São Tomé and Príncipe
Treaties of Saudi Arabia
Treaties of Senegal
Treaties of Serbia and Montenegro
Treaties of Seychelles
Treaties of Sierra Leone
Treaties of Singapore
Treaties of Slovakia
Treaties of Slovenia
Treaties of South Africa
Treaties of Spain
Treaties of Sri Lanka
Treaties of Saint Kitts and Nevis
Treaties of Saint Lucia
Treaties of Saint Vincent and the Grenadines
Treaties of the Republic of the Sudan (1985–2011)
Treaties of Suriname
Treaties of Eswatini
Treaties of Sweden
Treaties of Switzerland
Treaties of Syria
Treaties of Tajikistan
Treaties of Thailand
Treaties of East Timor
Treaties of North Macedonia
Treaties of Togo
Treaties of Tonga
Treaties of Trinidad and Tobago
Treaties of Tunisia
Treaties of Turkey
Treaties of Turkmenistan
Treaties of Uganda
Treaties of Ukraine
Treaties of the United Arab Emirates
Treaties of the United Kingdom
Treaties of Tanzania
Treaties of the United States
Treaties of Uruguay
Treaties of Uzbekistan
Treaties of Venezuela
Treaties of Vietnam
Treaties of Yemen
Treaties of Yugoslavia
Treaties of Zambia
Treaties of Zimbabwe
Treaties of the Holy See
Treaties of Chad
Treaties of the Democratic Republic of Afghanistan
Treaties of Nauru
Treaties of Vanuatu
Treaties entered into by the European Union
1988 in Austria
Treaties extended to the Netherlands Antilles
Treaties extended to Aruba
Treaties extended to Anguilla
Treaties extended to Bermuda
Treaties extended to the British Virgin Islands
Treaties extended to the Cayman Islands
Treaties extended to Montserrat
Treaties extended to the Turks and Caicos Islands
Treaties extended to Jersey
Treaties extended to Guernsey
Treaties extended to the Isle of Man
Treaties extended to Tokelau
Treaties extended to Portuguese Macau
Treaties extended to British Hong Kong
Treaties extended to Gibraltar